Manuel Marzupio (born 5 April 2000) is an Italian professional footballer who plays as a centre back for  club Pro Sesto.

Club career
On 16 July, he joined Serie C club Pro Sesto-

References

External links
 
 

2000 births
Living people
Italian footballers
Association football defenders
Serie C players
Serie D players
Virtus Bergamo Alzano Seriate 1909 players
Cavese 1919 players
Pro Sesto 2013 players